Frank Cordaro (born 1951) is a peace activist and co-founder of the Des Moines, Iowa, Catholic Worker group. He frequently attends protests and gives lectures at school and community events in Nebraska and Iowa. He was a Roman Catholic priest from 1985 until leaving the priesthood in 2003 for personal reasons, including his wish to be released from the vow of celibacy. Max McElwain calls him a Christian anarchist, and Cordaro frequently participates in peace rallies involving civil disobedience. He has been sentenced to at least eight six-month terms in federal jail for trespassing onto military bases and federal buildings during demonstrations, most often at Strategic Air Command at Offutt Air Force Base near Omaha, Nebraska.

Background
Cordaro grew up in Des Moines, and went to the University of Northern Iowa where he was a wrestler. During his period as a priest and since he has been an outspoken critic of some aspects of the Catholic Church, including advocating the ordination of women into priesthood.

Awards
He was awarded the Peace Abbey Courage of Conscience Award in November 1990.

References

Additional sources
 
"Priest released after serving 5 months for nuke protest", Chicago Sun-Times, September 13, 1988.
Max McElwain, "Practicing Christian anarchy. (Father Frank Cordaro.)" The Progressive, May 1, 1993.
"Priest Vows to Continue Protesting", Associated Press, April 28, 1995.
Pamela Schaeffer, "Priest threatened with excommunication. (Frank Cordaro of Lacona, IA held a forbidden mass for members at a Call to Action conference)" National Catholic Reporter, July 18, 1997.
"Priest takes leave for 'acting up'", Associated Press, June 6, 1999.
Kate Gurnett, "Protester-Priest's Politics Have Landed Him In Jail." Albany Times Union, February 14, 2000.
Aarons Dakarai, "Activist priest to leave church", Des Moines Register, August 5, 2003. 
Abby Simons, "Cordaro, no longer a priest, remains a dedicated activist", Des Moines Register, August 11, 2004. 
Mary Nevans-Pederson, "Activist urges Christians to shun war; Former priest says Jesus embraced pacifism, not the "just-war' theory", Telegraph Herald, April 7, 2005.
"Former Des Moines priest says prison has not weakened resolve", Associated Press, August 27, 2006.
"Occupy Des Moines Steps Onto the Political Stage", PBS NewsHour, January 3, 2012.
Regina Zilbermints, "Occupy Des Moines leaders thrust into spotlight", Des Moines Register, December 31, 2011.

External links
 Frank Cordaro's writings and a short biography can be found here.
 A video of Frank Cordaro discussing Christian Anarchism and peace activism can be found .

People from Iowa
Laicized Roman Catholic priests
American anti-war activists
Catholic Workers
American Christian pacifists
American Roman Catholics
Roman Catholic activists
1951 births
Living people
Northern Iowa Panthers wrestlers
American anarchists
Catholic anarchists